St Paul's Church, Woodford Bridge, is Church of England church in Woodford Bridge in east London. Population expansion in the area had led the ancient parish church of St Mary's Church, Woodford to rent an infant school for services in 1851. A permanent church was built in 1854 as a district chapelry. It suffered a fire in 1886, after which it was rebuilt in a Neo-Gothic version of the Decorated style.

References

Paul's